Tales from the Crypt may refer to:
 Tales from the Crypt (album), by American rapper C-Bo
 Tales from the Crypt (comics), published by EC Comics during the 1950s
 Tales from the Crypt (film), a 1972 Amicus film starring Ralph Richardson partially based on the comic book
 The Vault of Horror, also known as Tales from the Crypt II, a 1973 sequel starring Terry-Thomas, Dawn Adams, Denholm Elliott, and Curt Jurgens also partially based on the comic book
 Tales from the Crypt (TV series), a horror anthology series that ran from 1989 to 1996 based on the comic book
 Tales from the Crypt (radio series), an American radio series spun off from the TV series
 Demon Knight, also known as Tales from the Crypt: Demon Knight, a 1995 film starring Billy Zane, William Sadler and Jada Pinkett Smith that acted as a spin-off from the television series
 Bordello of Blood, also known as Tales from the Crypt Presents: Bordello of Blood, a 1996 film starring Dennis Miller, Erika Eleniak, Angie Everhart and Corey Feldman based on the television series
 Ritual (2002 film), also known as Tales From the Crypt Presents: Ritual, the fifth installment (third of the HBO spinoffs) in the series starring Tim Curry, Jennifer Grey and Craig Sheffer

See also 
 List of Tales from the Crypt episodes
 Tales from the Crib, the first full-length album by Canadian punk band d.b.s.; it was released in 1995
 Tales from the Cryptic, a 2002 album by accordionist Guy Klucevsek and saxophonist Phillip Johnston
 Tales from the Cryptkeeper, a 1993 animated TV series based on the Tales of the Crypt movies and comics